The 2023 Big Sky Conference men's basketball tournament was the postseason tournament for the Big Sky Conference, held March 4–8 at Idaho Central Arena in Boise, Idaho. It was the 48th edition of the conference tourney, which debuted in 1976.

Second-seeded Montana State defeated ninth seed Northern Arizona 85–78 in the final and received the conference's automatic bid to the NCAA tournament. The Bobcats successfully defended their conference tournament title and earned a second straight NCAA appearance, their fifth overall.

Finalist NAU upset top-seeded Eastern Washington by a point in the quarterfinals and fourth seed Montana by twelve in the semifinals. The other semifinal was rematch of the previous year, with a similar result; this time, MSU needed double overtime to eliminate third seed Weber State 60–58. In 2022, they outlasted the Wildcats by three points in regulation.

Seeds 
The ten teams were seeded by conference record; the top six teams received a first-round bye.

Schedule

Bracket 

Note: * denotes overtime

References

See also 
 2023 Big Sky Conference women's basketball tournament

2022–23 Big Sky Conference men's basketball season
Big Sky Conference men's basketball tournament
2023 in sports in Idaho
Basketball competitions in Boise, Idaho
College basketball tournaments in Idaho